North American moths represent about 12,000 types of moths. In comparison, there are about 825 species of North American butterflies. The moths (mostly nocturnal) and butterflies (mostly diurnal) together make up the taxonomic order Lepidoptera.

This list is sorted on MONA number (MONA is short for Moths of America North of Mexico). A numbering system for North American moths introduced by Ronald W. Hodges, et al. in 1983 in the publication Check List of the Lepidoptera of America North of Mexico. The list has since been updated, but the placement in families is outdated for some species.

This list covers America north of Mexico (effectively the continental United States and Canada). For a list of moths and butterflies recorded from the state of Hawaii, see List of Lepidoptera of Hawaii.

This is a partial list, covering moths with MONA numbers ranging from 2312 to 2700.1. For the rest of the list, see List of moths of North America.

Copromorphoidea and Alucitidae
2312 – Lotisma trigonana 
2313 – Alucita montana, six-plume moth
2313.1 – Alucita adriendenisi 
2313.2 – Alucita lalannei 
2314 – Carposina sasakii, peach fruit moth
2315 – Carposina fernaldana, currant fruitworm moth
2316 – Carposina simulator 
2317 – Carposina biloba 
2318 – Bondia comonana 
2319 – Bondia crescentella 
2320 – Bondia shastana 
2321 – Bondia spicata 
2322 – Bondia fidelis 
2323 – Bondia fuscata 
2324 – Tesuquea hawleyana

Epermeniidae
2325 – Epermenia imperialella 
no number yet – Epermenia falcata 
no number yet – Epermenia canadensis 
2326 – Epermenia stolidota 
2327 – Epermenia californica 
2328 – Epermenia albapunctella 
2329 – Epermenia cicutaella 
2330 – Epermenia pimpinella 
2331 – Epermenia lomatii 
2332 – Epermenia infracta 
2334 – Ochromolopis ramapoella 
2335 – Parochromolopis floridana

Yponomeutoidea
2336 – Abrenthia cuprea 
2336.1 – Neomachlotica spiraea 
2336.2 – Drymoana blanchardi 
2336.3 – Glyphipterix floridensis 
2337 – Glyphipterix circumscriptella 
2337.1 – Glyphipterix brauni 
2338 – Glyphipterix quadragintapunctata 
2338.1 – Glyphipterix powelli 
2338.2 – Glyphipterix urticae 
2339 – Glyphipterix bifasciata 
2339.1 – Glyphipterix hypenantia 
2339.2 – Glyphipterix yosemitella 
2340 – Glyphipterix unifasciata 
2341 – Glyphipterix haworthana, Haworth's glyphipterid moth
2341.1 – Glyphipterix sistes 
2342 – Glyphipterix californiae 
2342.1 – Glyphipterix feniseca 
2342.2 – Glyphipterix juncivora 
2342.3 – Glyphipterix sierranevadae 
2342.4 – Glyphipterix arizonensis 
2342.5 – Glyphipterix roenastes 
2343 – Glyphipterix saurodonta 
2344 – Glyphipterix montisella 
2344.1 – Glyphipterix chiricahuae 
2344.2 – Glyphipterix hodgesi 
2344.3 – Glyphipterix cherokee 
2344.4 – Glyphipterix chambersi 
2344.5 – Glyphipterix flavimaculata 
2344.6 – Glyphipterix melanoscirta 
2344.7 – Glyphipterix santaritae 
2344.8 – Glyphipterix ruidosensis 
2344.9 – Glyphipterix nordini 
2345 – Diploschizia lanista 
2345.1 – Diploschizia minimella 
2345.2 – Diploschizia kutisi 
2345.3 – Diploschizia seminolensis 
2345.4 – Diploschizia habecki 
2345.5 – Diploschizia regia 
2346 – Diploschizia impigritella, yellow nutsedge moth
2346.1 – Diploschizia kimballi
2347 – Araeolepia subfasciella 
2348 – Ellabella editha 
2349 – Ellabella melanoclista 
2349.1 – Ellabella bayensis 
2349.2 – Ellabella johnstoni
2350 – Eucalantica polita
2350.1 – Eucalantica vaquero
2351 – Euceratia castella 
2352 – Euceratia securella 
2353 – Homadaula anisocentra, mimosa webworm moth
2354 – Ypsolopha heteraula 
2355 – Pliniaca bakerella 
2356 – Pliniaca sparsisquamella 
2357 – Plutella albidorsella 
2358 – Plutella armoraciae 
2358.1 – Plutella haasi 
2359 – Eidophasia dammersi 
2360 – Rhigognostis interrupta 
2361 – Plutella notabilis 
2362 – Plutella omissa 
2362.1 – Plutella polaris 
2363 – Plutella porrectella, dame's violet moth
2364 – Rhigognostis poulella 
2365 – Plutella vanella 
2366 – Plutella xylostella, diamondback moth
2367 – Ypsolopha aleutianella 
2368 – Ypsolopha angelicella 
2369 – Ypsolopha arizonella 
2370 – Ypsolopha barberella 
2370.1 – Ypsolopha buscki 
2371 – Ypsolopha canariella, canary ypsolopha moth
2372 – Ypsolopha cervella 
2373 – Ypsolopha cockerella 
2374 – Ypsolopha delicatella 
2375 – Ypsolopha dentella, European honeysuckle moth
2376 – Ypsolopha dentiferella 
2377 – Ypsolopha dorsimaculella 
2378 – Ypsolopha electropa 
2379 – Ypsolopha elongata 
2380 – Ypsolopha falciferella 
2381 – Ypsolopha flavistrigella 
2382 – Ypsolopha frustella 
2383 – Ypsolopha gerdanella 
2384 – Ypsolopha leptaula 
2385 – Ypsolopha lyonothamnae 
2386 – Ypsolopha maculatella 
2387 – Ypsolopha manella 
2388 – Ypsolopha nella 
2389 – Ypsolopha oliviella 
2390 – Ypsolopha querciella 
2391 – Ypsolopha rubrella 
2392 – Ypsolopha senex 
2393 – Ypsolopha schwarziella 
2394 – Ypsolopha striatella 
2395 – Ypsolopha sublucella 
2396 – Ypsolopha undulatella 
2397 – Ypsolopha unicipunctella 
2398 – Ypsolopha ustella, variable ypsolopha moth
2399 – Ypsolopha vintrella 
2400 – Ypsolopha walsinghamiella 
2401 – Atteva aurea, ailanthus webworm moth
2402 – Eucatagma amyrisella 
2403 – Lactura atrolinea 
2404 – Lactura basistriga 
2405 – Lactura pupula, bumelia leafworm moth
2406 – Lactura psammitis 
2407 – Lactura subfervens 
2408 – Lactura rhodocentra 
2409 – Ocnerostoma piniariella 
2410 – Ocnerostoma strobivorum 
2411 – Atemelia aetherias 
2412 – Podiasa chiococcella 
2413 – Swammerdamia caesiella 
2414 – Swammerdamia pyrella, rufous-tipped swammerdamia moth
2414.1 – Swammerdamia beirnei 
2414.2 – Swammerdamia lutarea 
2415 – Urodus parvula, bumelia webworm moth
2415.1 – Wockia asperipunctella 
2416 – Yponomeuta atomocella, hop-tree ermine moth
2417 – Yponomeuta euonymella 
2418 – Yponomeuta leucothorax 
2419 – Yponomeuta martinella 
2420 – Yponomeuta multipunctella, American ermine moth
2421 – Yponomeuta padella, orchard ermine moth
2421.1 – Yponomeuta malinellus, apple ermine moth
2422 – Yponomeuta plumbella, large-spot ermine moth
2423 – Yponomeuta semialbus 
2423.1 – Yponomeuta cagnagella, spindle ermine moth
2424 – Zelleria arizonica 
2425 – Kessleria celastrusella 
2426 – Euhyponomeutoides gracilariella 
2427 – Zelleria haimbachi, pine needle sheathminer moth
2428 – Zelleria ochroplagiata 
2429 – Kessleria parnassiae 
2430 – Zelleria pyri 
2431 – Zelleria retiniella 
2432 – Zelleria semitincta 
2433 – Argyresthia abies 
2434 – Argyresthia affinis 
2435 – Argyresthia alternatella 
2436 – Argyresthia altissimella 
2437 – Argyresthia annettella 
2438 – Argyresthia apicimaculella 
2439 – Argyresthia arceuthobiella 
2440 – Argyresthia aureoargentella 
2441 – Argyresthia austerella 
2442 – Argyresthia belangerella 
2443 – Argyresthia bolliella 
2444 – Argyresthia calliphanes 
2445 – Argyresthia canadensis 
2446 – Argyresthia castaneella 
2447 – Argyresthia chalcochrysa 
2448 – Argyresthia columbia 
2449 – Argyresthia conjugella, apple fruit moth
2450 – Argyresthia cupressella 
2451 – Argyresthia deletella 
2452 – Argyresthia eugeniella, guava fruit moth
2453 – Argyresthia franciscella 
2454 – Argyresthia flexilis 
2455 – Argyresthia freyella 
2456 – Argyresthia furcatella 
2457 – Argyresthia goedartella, bronze alder moth
2458 – Argyresthia inscriptella 
2459 – Argyresthia laricella, larch shoot moth
2460 – Argyresthia libocedrella 
2461 – Argyresthia mariana 
2462 – Argyresthia media 
2463 – Argyresthia mesocausta 
2464 – Argyresthia monochromella 
2465 – Argyresthia montella 
2466 – Argyresthia nymphocoma 
2467 – Argyresthia oreasella, cherry shoot borer moth
2468 – Argyresthia pallidella 
2469 – Argyresthia pedmontella 
2470 – Argyresthia picea 
2471 – Argyresthia pilatella 
2472 – Argyresthia plicipunctella 
2473 – Argyresthia pseudotsuga 
2474 – Argyresthia pygmaeella 
2475 – Argyresthia quadristrigella 
2476 – Argyresthia quercicolella 
2477 – Argyresthia rileiella 
2478 – Argyresthia ruidosa 
2479 – Argyresthia subreticulata, speckled argyresthia moth
2480 – Argyresthia thoracella 
2481 – Argyresthia thuiella, arborvitae leafminer moth
2482 – Argyresthia trifasciae 
2483 – Argyresthia tsuga 
2484 – Argyresthia undulatella 
2485 – Tinagma giganteum 
2485.1 – Tinagma brunneofasciatum 
2485.2 – Tinagma powelli 
2485.3 – Tinagma californicum 
2485.4 – Tinagma gaedikei 
2487 – Tinagma obscurofasciella 
2488 – Tinagma ochremaculella 
2489 – Tinagma pulverilinea 
2489.1 – Digitivalva clarkei 
2490 – Acrolepiopsis incertella, carrionflower moth
2490.1 – Acrolepiopsis heppneri 
2490.2 – Acrolepiopsis californica 
2491 – Acrolepiopsis leucoscia 
2492 – Acrolepiopsis reticulosa 
2492.1 – Acrolepiopsis assectella 
2493 – Cycloplasis panicifoliella 
2493.1 – Cycloplasis immaculata 
2494 – Scelorthus pisoniella 
2495 – Lamprolophus lithella 
2496 – Embola albaciliella 
2496.1 – Embola autumnalis 
2497 – Aetole bella 
2497.1 – Aetole prenticei 
2497.2 – Aetole schulzella 
2497.3 – Aetole cera 
2497.4 – Aetole favonia 
2497.5 – Aetole aprica 
2498 – Embola ciccella 
2498.1 – Embola cyanozostera 
2499 – Aetole extraneella 
2500 – Embola ionis 
2500.1 – Embola powelli 
2502 – Neoheliodines nyctaginella 
2502.1 – Neoheliodines cliffordi 
2502.2 – Neoheliodines albidentus 
2502.3 – Neoheliodines arizonense 
2502.4 – Neoheliodines eurypterus 
2502.5 – Neoheliodines hodgesi 
2502.6 – Neoheliodines melanobasilarus 
2502.7 – Neoheliodines vernius 
2504 – Embola sexpunctella 
2504.1 – Euheliodines chemsaki 
2505 – Aetole tripunctella 
2506 – Aetole unipunctella 
2507 – Schreckensteinia erythriella 
2508 – Schreckensteinia felicella 
2509 – Schreckensteinia festaliella, blackberry skeletonizer moth
2510 – Lithariapteryx abroniaeella 
2511 – Lithariapteryx jubarella 
2512 – Lithariapteryx mirabilinella 
2512.1 – Lithariapteryx elegans

Sesiidae
2513 – Pennisetia marginatum, raspberry crown borer moth
2513.1 – Sophona greenfieldi 
2513.2 – Sophona snellingi 
2514 – Zenodoxus canescens 
2515 – Zenodoxus heucherae 
2516 – Zenodoxus maculipes 
2517 – Zenodoxus mexicanus 
2518 – Zenodoxus palmii 
2519 – Zenodoxus rubens 
2520 – Zenodoxus sidalceae 
2521 – Cissuvora ampelopsis 
2522 – Paranthrene asilipennis, oak clearwing moth
2523 – Paranthrene dollii, poplar clearwing moth
2524 – Paranthrene tabaniformis, European poplar clearwing moth
2525 – Paranthrene fenestrata 
2526 – Paranthrene robiniae, western poplar clearwing moth
2527 – Paranthrene simulans, red oak clearwing moth
2527.1 – Paranthrene pellucida, pin oak clearwing moth
2528 – Vitacea admiranda 
2529 – Vitacea cupressi 
2530 – Vitacea polistiformis, grape root borer moth
2531 – Vitacea scepsiformis, lesser grape root borer moth
2532 – Albuna fraxini, Virginia creeper clearwing moth
2533 – Albuna pyramidalis, fireweed clearwing moth
2533.5 – Tirista praxilla 
2533.6 – Tirista argentifrons 
2534 – Euhagena emphytiformis, gaura borer moth
2535 – Euhagena nebraskae, Nebraska clearwing moth
2536 – Melittia cucurbitae, squash vine borer moth
2537 – Melittia calabaza 
2538 W – Melittia snowii, clearwing borer moth
2539 – Melittia grandis 
2540 – Melittia gloriosa, glorious squash vine borer moth
2541 – Melittia magnifica 
2542 – Sesia apiformis, European hornet moth
2543 – Sesia tibiale, American hornet moth
2543.1 – Sesia spartani 
2544 – Calasesia coccinea 
2545 – Osminia ruficornis 
2545.1 – Osminia donahueorum 
2545.2 – Osminia bicornicolis 
2546 – Synanthedon acerrubri, maple clearwing moth
2547 – Synanthedon geliformis, pecan bark borer moth
2548 – Synanthedon richardsi 
2549 – Synanthedon scitula, dogwood borer moth
2550 – Synanthedon pictipes, lesser peachtree borer moth
2551 – Synanthedon rhododendri, rhododendron borer moth
2552 – Synanthedon rileyana, Riley's clearwing moth
2553 – Synanthedon tipuliformis, currant borer moth
2554 – Synanthedon acerni, maple callus borer moth
2555 – Synanthedon fatifera, lesser viburnum clearwing moth
2556 – Synanthedon viburni, viburnum clearwing moth
2557 – Synanthedon alleri 
2558 – Synanthedon arctica 
2559 – Synanthedon bolteri, northern willow clearwing moth
2560 – Synanthedon canadensis 
2561 – Synanthedon culiciformis, large red-belted clearwing moth
2562 – Synanthedon dominicki 
2563 – Synanthedon fulvipes 
2564 – Synanthedon helenis 
2565 – Synanthedon pyri, apple bark borer moth
2566 – Synanthedon refulgens, red-lined clearwing moth
2567 – Synanthedon rubrofascia, tupelo clearwing moth
2568 – Synanthedon saxifragae 
2569 – Synanthedon sigmoidea, willow clearwing moth
2570 – Synanthedon albicornis, western willow clearwing moth
2571 – Synanthedon decipiens, oakgall borer moth
2572 – Synanthedon proxima, eastern willow clearwing moth
2573 – Synanthedon sapygaeformis, Florida oakgall moth
2574 – Synanthedon arizonensis 
2575 – Synanthedon arkansasensis 
2576 – Synanthedon bibionipennis, strawberry crown moth
2577 – Synanthedon castaneae, chestnut borer moth
2578 – Synanthedon chrysidipennis 
2579 – Synanthedon kathyae, holly borer moth
2580 – Synanthedon mellinipennis, ceanothus borer moth
2581 – Synanthedon polygoni, buckwheat borer moth
2582 – Synanthedon resplendens, sycamore borer moth
2583 – Synanthedon exitiosa, peachtree borer moth
2584 – Synanthedon novaroensis, Douglas fir pitch moth
2585 – Synanthedon pini, pitch mass borer moth
2586 – Synanthedon sequoiae, sequoia pitch moth
2586.1 – Synanthedon myopaeformis, apple clearwing moth
2586.96 – Synanthedon n. sp., undescribed species
2587 – Palmia praecedens 
2588 – Podosesia aureocincta, banded ash clearwing moth
2589 – Podosesia syringae, ash borer moth
2590 – Sannina uroceriformis, persimmon borer moth
2591 – Carmenta albociliata 
2592 – Carmenta anthracipennis, blazing star clearwing moth
2593 – Carmenta apache 
2594 – Carmenta arizonae 
2594.1 – Carmenta armasata 
2595 – Carmenta auritincta, Arizona clearwing moth
2596 – Carmenta bassiformis, ironweed clearwing moth
2597 – Carmenta corni 
2598 – Carmenta engelhardti 
2598.1 – Carmenta flaschkai 
2599 – Carmenta giliae 
2600 – Carmenta ithacae 
2600.1 – Carmenta laurelae 
2601 – Carmenta mariona 
2602 W – Carmenta mimuli, coronopus borer moth
2603 – Carmenta odda 
2604 – Carmenta ogalala 
2605 – Carmenta pallene 
2606 – Carmenta phoradendri, mistletoe borer moth
2607 – Carmenta prosopis, mesquite clearwing moth
2608 – Carmenta pyralidiformis, boneset borer moth
2609 – Carmenta querci 
2610 – Carmenta rubricincta 
2611 – Carmenta subaerea 
2612 – Carmenta suffusata 
2613 – Carmenta tecta 
2614 – Carmenta texana, Texana clearwing moth
2615 – Carmenta verecunda 
2615.1 – Carmenta wielgusi 
2616 – Carmenta welchelorum 
2617 – Carmenta wellerae 
2617.1 – Carmenta tildeni 
2618 – Penstemonia clarkei 
2619 – Penstemonia dammersi 
2620 – Penstemonia edwardsii, penstemon borer moth
2621 – Penstemonia hennei 
2621.1 – Penstemonia pappi 
2622 – Alcathoe carolinensis, clematis borer moth
2622.1 – Alcathoe autumnalis 
2623 – Alcathoe caudata, clematis clearwing moth
2624 – Alcathoe pepsioides 
2625 – Alcathoe verrugo 
2626 – Hymenoclea palmii, burrowbush borer moth
2626.1 – Phormoestes palmettovora 
2626.2 – Chamaesphecia hungarica 
2626.3 – Chamaesphecia tenthrediniformis 
2626.4 – Chamaesphecia crassicornis

Choreutidae
2627 – Brenthia pavonacella, peacock brenthia moth
2628 – Anthophila alpinella 
2629 – Prochoreutis inflatella, skullcap skeletonizer moth
2630 – Prochoreutis sororculella 
2631 – Prochoreutis dyarella 
2632 – Prochoreutis extrincicella 
2633 – Prochoreutis pernivalis 
2634 – Caloreas apocynoglossa 
2635 – Caloreas occidentella 
2636 – Caloreas coloradella 
2637 – Caloreas caliginosa 
2638 – Caloreas schausiella 
2639 – Caloreas augustella 
2640 – Caloreas multimarginata 
2640.1 – Caloreas melanifera 
2641 – Caloreas leucobasis 
2642 – Tebenna silphiella, rosinweed moth
2643 – Tebenna balsamorrhizella 
2644 – Tebenna gemmalis 
2645 – Tebenna immutabilis 
2646 – Tebenna piperella 
2647 – Tebenna gnaphaliella, everlasting tebbena moth
2648 – Tebenna onustana 
2649 – Tebenna carduiella 
2650 – Choreutis pariana, apple leaf skeletonizer moth
2651 – Choreutis diana, Diana's choreutis moth
2652 – Choreutis betuliperda 
2652.1 – Choreutis myllerana
2653 – Tortyra slossonia, Slosson's metalmark moth
2653.1 – Tortyra iocyaneus 
2654 – Hemerophila dyari 
2655 – Hemerophila diva, diva hemerophila moth

Cossidae
2656 – Hypopta palmata 
2657 – Inguromorpha itzalana 
2658 – Inguromorpha arcifera 
2659 – Inguromorpha basalis, black-lined carpenterworm moth
2660 – Givira mucida 
2661 – Givira arbeloides 
2662 – Givira theodori 
2663 – Givira durangona 
2664 – Givira carla 
2665 – Givira cornelia 
2666 – Givira lucretia 
2667 – Givira ethela 
2668 – Givira anna, anna carpenterworm moth
2669 – Givira marga 
2670 – Givira lotta, pine carpenterworm moth
2671 – Givira francesca 
2672 – Givira minuta 
2673 – Givira cleopatra 
2674 – Cossula magnifica, pecan carpenterworm moth
2675 – Acossus centerensis, poplar carpenterworm moth
2676 – Acossus populi, aspen carpenterworm moth
2677 – Acossus undosus 
2678 – Fania connecta 
2679 – Comadia henrici 
2680 – Comadia suaedivora, alkali blite borer moth
2681 – Comadia dolli 
2682 – Comadia intrusa 
2683 – Comadia arenae 
2684 – Comadia subterminata 
2685 – Comadia sperata 
2686 – Comadia bertholdi, lupine borer moth
2687 – Comadia alleni 
2688 – Comadia manfredi 
2689 – Comadia redtenbacheri 
2690 – Comadia albistriga 
2691 – Fania nanus 
2692 – Prionoxystus piger, baccharis carpenterworm moth
2693 – Prionoxystus robiniae, carpenterworm moth
2694 – Prionoxystus macmurtrei, little carpenterworm moth
2695 – Miacora perplexa 
2696 – Miacora luzena 
2697 – Aramos ramosa 
2698 – Hamilcara atra 
2699 – Psychonoctua gilensis 
2699.1 – Psychonoctua masoni 
2700 – Zeuzera pyrina, leopard moth
2700.1 – Morpheis clenchi

See also
List of butterflies of North America
List of Lepidoptera of Hawaii
List of moths of Canada
List of butterflies of Canada

External links
Checklists of North American Moths

Moths of North America
North America